The 2023 ICC Under-19 Women's T20 World Cup was the first edition of the ICC Women's Under-19 Cricket World Cup, hosted by South Africa in 2023. The tournament was moved from its original slot at the end of 2021 to January 2023 because of the COVID-19 pandemic. Sixteen teams competed in the tournament, initially divided into four groups.

India, England, Australia and New Zealand progressed to the semi-finals of the competition. In the semi-finals, India beat New Zealand by 8 wickets and England beat Australia by 3 runs. The final took place on 29 January 2023 at Senwes Park, Potchefstroom, and saw India beat England by 7 wickets to become the inaugural champions of the ICC Under-19 Women's T20 World Cup.

Background
Originally, the tournament was scheduled to take place in January 2021, before being moved back to December 2021 due to the COVID-19 pandemic. In November 2020, the ICC looked at the possibility of deferring the tournament from its scheduled slot of January 2021 to later in the year. In January 2021, the Bangladesh Cricket Board (BCB) confirmed that they would host the tournament in December 2021, however the tournament was postponed for a second time, and was moved to January 2023. In January 2022, Geoff Allardice, the CEO of the ICC said that the tournament was "very much on the cards", and that the ICC were starting the process for hosts.

Qualification

In June 2022, the ICC confirmed the qualification process for the tournament. Hosts South Africa, along with Australia, Bangladesh, England, India, Ireland, New Zealand, Pakistan, Sri Lanka, West Indies and Zimbabwe all qualified automatically for the tournament. The United States also qualified automatically, as they were the only eligible team to compete from the Americas regional group. The four remaining places will come from regional qualification groups. The United Arab Emirates were the first team to qualify from the regional groups, after they won the Asia Qualifier. Indonesia won their three-match series against Papua New Guinea to win the East Asia-Pacific group to qualify. It was the first time that Indonesia had qualified for an ICC World Cup tournament at any level. Rwanda won the African Qualifiers to qualify for the World Cup. It was for the first time that Rwanda had qualified for an ICC World Cup tournament at any level. This is also the first ICC Women's World Cup for Scotland, United Arab Emirates, United States, and Zimbabwe at any level.

Competition format
The 16 teams were divided into four groups of four, and play once against each other side in their group. The top three teams in each group progressed to the Super Six League stage, where qualifying teams from Group A played against two of the qualifying teams from Group D, and qualifying teams from Group B played against two of the qualifying teams from Group C. Points from matches against teams that also qualified from the first group stage were carried forward into the Super Six League stage. The top two sides from each of the Super Six Leagues progressed to the semi-finals, with the final taking place on 29 January 2023.

Squads

Each team could select a squad of fifteen players for the tournament, with additional non-travelling reserves also able to be named. England were the first side to name their squad, doing so on 18 October 2022.

Match officials
On 5 January 2023, ICC announced the names of fifteen match officials for the tournament, of whom nine were women – making it the highest number of female match officials to be appointed for any ICC event.

Match Referees
  Vanessa Bowen
  Owen Chirombe
  Niamur Rashid

Umpires

  Maria Abbott
  Sarah Bartlett
  Sarah Dambanevana
  Jasmine Naeem
  Kerrin Klaaste
  Wayne Knights
  Candace la Borde
  Lisa McCabe
  Ahmed Shah Pakteen
  Sharfuddoula
  Virender Sharma
  Dedunu Silva

Venues

Warm-up matches 
The following warm-up matches were played before the tournament's official start:

Group stage

Group A

 Advanced to Super 6

Group B

 Advanced to Super 6

Group C

 Advanced to Super 6

Group D

(H) Host  
 Advanced to Super 6

Fourth-Place play-offs

Super 6

Super 6 Group 1

(H) Host  
 Advanced to Knockout Stage

Super 6 Group 2 
 
 Advanced to Knockout Stage

Knockout stage

Semi-finals

Final

Statistics
 Highest score by a team: India – 219/3 (20 overs) v United Arab Emirates (16 January).
 Top score by an individual: Grace Scrivens – 93 (56) v Ireland (21 January).
 Best bowling figures by an individual: Ellie Anderson – 5/12 (4 overs) v West Indies (25 January).

Most runs

Source: ESPNcricinfo

Most wickets

Source: ESPNcricinfo

Team of the tournament
On 30 January 2023, the ICC announced the Team of the Tournament. Grace Scrivens was also named Player of the Tournament.

 Shweta Sehrawat
 Grace Scrivens (c)
 Shafali Verma
 Georgia Plimmer
 Dewmi Vihanga
 Shorna Akter
 Karabo Meso (wk)
 Parshavi Chopra
 Hannah Baker
 Ellie Anderson
 Maggie Clark
 Anosha Nasir (12th woman)

References

External links
 Tournament home at ESPN Cricinfo

Under-19 Women's T20 World Cup
International cricket competitions in 2022–23
2023 in women's cricket
2023 in South African sport
U19 Women's T20 World Cup
U19 Women's T20 World Cup, 2023
Cricket events postponed due to the COVID-19 pandemic
ICC